Tiémoko Ismaël Diomandé (born 28 August 1992) is an Ivorian professional footballer who plays as a midfielder for Samsunspor and the Ivory Coast national team.

Career
Ismaël Diomandé was born in Abidjan, Ivory Coast, and first played as a youngster in Académie Mimosas. He moved to the suburbs of Paris in 2008 and spent a few years in the Paris FC academy.

In 2010, Diomandé joined Ligue 1 Saint-Étienne's youth teams. At Saint-Étienne, he was in the starting lineup of the 2011 U19 Gambardella Cup final against Monaco. In the same year, he broke into the first team before signing a professional contract in 2012.

Diomandé was loaned out to Stade Malherbe Caen in the winter transfer window of January 2016. In June 2016, he joined the club permanently, signing a three-year contract.

Career statistics

International

Honours
Saint-Étienne
French League Cup: 2012–13

Ivory Coast
 Africa Cup of Nations: 2015

References

External links
 
 

1992 births
Living people
Footballers from Abidjan
Ivorian footballers
Ivorian expatriate footballers
Association football midfielders
Ivory Coast international footballers
2014 FIFA World Cup players
2015 Africa Cup of Nations players
Africa Cup of Nations-winning players
Ligue 1 players
Süper Lig players
TFF First League players
Stade Malherbe Caen players
AS Saint-Étienne players
Konyaspor footballers
Çaykur Rizespor footballers
Samsunspor footballers
Ivorian expatriate sportspeople in Turkey
Expatriate footballers in Turkey